Pseudotegenaria is a genus of North African funnel weavers containing the single species, Pseudotegenaria parva. It was  first described by Lodovico di Caporiacco in 1934, and has only been found in Libya.

References

External links

Agelenidae
Monotypic Araneomorphae genera
Spiders of Africa